Sprague is an unincorporated community in southwest Bates County, in the U.S. state of Missouri. The community is five miles west of Rich Hill via Missouri route A and WW. The Harmony Mission Lake Conservation Area lies within one mile to the southeast.

History
A post office called Sprague was established in 1880, and remained in operation until 1926. Some say the community was named after Charles Sprague, a local storekeeper, while others believe the name honors H. C. Sprague, a railroad official.

References

Unincorporated communities in Bates County, Missouri
Unincorporated communities in Missouri